Plasmodium megaglobularis is a species of malaria-causing parasite in the genus Plasmodium, subgenus Novyella. As in all Plasmodium species, P. megaglobularis has both vertebrate and insect hosts. The vertebrate hosts for this parasite are birds.

Taxonomy
The parasite was first described by Valkiūnas et al. in 2008.

Distribution 
This parasite is found in Ghana and Cameroon.

Hosts
P. megaglobularis infects the olive sunbird (Cyanomitra olivacea).

References

megaglobularis
Parasites of birds